The Silent Guardian is a 1925 American silent Western film directed by Billy Bletcher and starring Louise Lorraine, Harry Tenbrook, and Art Acord.

Cast

References

Bibliography
 Donald W. McCaffrey & Christopher P. Jacobs. Guide to the Silent Years of American Cinema. Greenwood Publishing, 1999.

External links
 

1925 films
1925 Western (genre) films
American black-and-white films
Silent American Western (genre) films
1920s English-language films
1920s American films